4 Copas is an organic Tequila distilled by Tequila Las Americas, located in Amatitan, Jalisco, Mexico which uses sustainable organic methods. The company also participates in the supporting of Sea Turtle Restoration Project an organization dedicated to research and support of conservation of Sea Turtles.

Products 
 4 Copas Blanco
 4 Copas Reposado
 4 Copas Anejo
 4 Copas Limited Edition (minimum 3 years aging)
 4 Copas Sea Turtles Limited (proceeds benefit Sea Turtle Restoration Project)
 4 Copas Organic Nectar (raw Agave Juice)

Awards 
 2006 Gold Reposado Tequila San Francisco World Spirits Competition
 2006 Silver Blanco Tequila San Francisco World Spirits Competition
 2006 Bronze Anejo Tequila San Francisco World Spirits Competition

References 

Tequila
Alcoholic drink brands